Jesús Castro Marte (born 18 March 1966) is a Dominican Catholic bishop, being the bishop of the Diocese of Higüey since 2020. He was previously an auxiliary bishop of the Archdiocese of Santo Domingo and titular bishop of Giufi from 2017 to 2020.

Biography
Castro Marte studied philosophy and theology at the Pontifical Catholic University in Santiago de los Caballeros. He then studied bioethics at the Regina Apostolorum in Rome. He was ordained a priest on 13 June 1995 for the archdiocese of Santo Domingo. On 1 July 2017 Castro Marte was appointed by Pope Francis as an auxiliary bishop of the archdiocese of Santo Domingo as well as the titular bishop of Giufi. He was ordained a bishop on 26 August 2017 by the archbishop of Santo Domingo Francisco Ozoria Acosta with the co-consecrators being Rafael Leónidas Felipe y Núñez and Andrés Napoleón Romero Cárdenas.

On 31 May 2020 Castro Marte was appointed by Pope Francis as the new bishop of Higüey. He was installed as bishop of Higüey at the Basílica Catedral Nuestra Señora de la Altagracia on 28 July 2020. Due to COVID-19 pandemic the event was streamed live with limited in-person audience.

References

External links

1966 births
Living people
People from Santo Domingo Province
21st-century Roman Catholic titular bishops
21st-century Roman Catholic bishops in the Dominican Republic
Roman Catholic bishops of Nuestra Señora de la Altagracia in Higüey
Roman Catholic bishops of Santo Domingo